The sailfin snapper (Symphorichthys spilurus), blue-lined sea bream or blue-lined sea perch is a species of marine ray-finned fish, a snapper belonging to the family Lutjanidae. It is native to the Indo-Pacific region. It is of minor importance to local commercial fisheries and can be found in the aquarium trade.  It is currently the only known member of its genus.

Taxonomy 
The sailfin snapper was first formally described in 1874 by the German-born British ichthyologist Albert Günther as Symphorus spilurus with the type locality given as Palau. The Australian marine scientist Ian Stafford Ross Munro placed it in the monotypic genus Symphorichthys in 1967. The genus Symphorichthys is one of two genera in the subfamily Paradicichthyinae of the snapper family Lutjanidae. The genus name Symphorichthys is a reference to the former classification within the genus Symphorus. The specific name spilurus is a compound of spilos meaning “spot” and urus meaning “tail”, a reference to the sizeable black blotch on the dorsal surface of the adults’ caudal peduncle.

Description 
The sailfin snapper has a body which is deep and laterally compressed with a rounded dorsal profile of the head, an angular forehead and a steeply sloped snout. The mouth extends as far back as the anterior edge of the eye. There is no incision or protuberance on the preoperculum. The upper jaw has a row of small, flattened teeth with roughly 3 rows in the lower jaw, both jaws have an outer row of short conical teeth, a little bigger than the other teeth. There is no patch of vomerine teeth. The dorsal fin has 10 spine and 14-18 soft rays while the anal fin contains 3 spines and 8-11 soft rays. At least one of the anterior soft rays in both the dorsal and anal fins extends beyond the fin membrane to create a long filament. The pectoral fins are long, sometimes extending past the level of the anus and contain 16 fin rays. The caudal fin is emarginate. The colour of the body is yellowish body with blue horizontal stripes along the flanks. There is a large pale-margined black spot on the upper caudal peduncle, an orange bar over the eye and another to the rear of the head. The juveniles have an overall pale greyish colour broken by a wide white-bordered black stripe running along the middle of the flanks from the snout to the rear margin of the tail. The juveniles have the elongated filaments in the dorsal and anal fin but these are yellowish.

Distribution and habitat 
The sailfin snapper is found in the eastern Indian Ocean and the western Pacific Ocean. In the Indian Ocean it occurs at the Rowley Shoals and near Broome, Western Australia. In the Pacific Ocean it is found east as far as Tonga and Fiji, north to the Ryukyu Islands and south to New Caledonia and the Great Barrier Reef. There are also records from the Mentawai Islands off western Sumatra and off the west coast of Thailand. It lives in areas of sand near to reefs in lagoons and over outer reefs.

Biology 
The sailfin snapper is typically encountered singly but adults aggregate to spawn along the outer edges of reefs. They forage in the sand for benthic crustaceans and molluscs as well as preying on fishes.

Fisheries
The sailfin snapper is targeted in mixed species fisheries throughout its range. In areas such as the Philippines it is known to be overfished, while in others, for example Palau, pressure is lighter. The juveniles appear in the aquarium trade.

References

External links
 

Paradicichthyinae
Fish described in 1874
Taxa named by Albert Günther